Ruben Muradyan (born April 14, 1989) is an Armenian ballet dancer, presenter and actor. He is a leading soloist with the Yerevan Opera Theatre and an Honored Artist of Armenia (2016).

Early life and career
Muradyan was born on April 14, 1989 in the village of Apaga, Armavir Province. In 1999–2007, he studied at the Yerevan State Dance College. In 2006–2011, he studied at the Yerevan State Institute of Theatre and Cinematography. Since 2004 he has been working at the Yerevan Opera Theatre as a leading soloist.

Muradyan has toured to USA with the Bolshoi Theatre of Moscow and has appeared on the Spartacus ballet as Spartacus. He has also toured in Spain, Italy, France, Russia and Qatar.

In 2014, Muradyan starred as the love interest of singer Lilit Hovhannisyan in the music video for "De El Mi". In 2016, he appeared in two Armenia TV series Honeymoon and Ancient Kings. In 2016, he was awarded with Honored Artist of Armenia. Since 2019, Murdayan has been hosting the morning program Morning of Light (Aravot luso) on Public Television Company of Armenia. In 2021, he starred in the series The Mechanics of Happiness along with actress Nazeni Hovhannisyan.

Personal life
Muradyan is married and has a daughter and a son.

Accolades

Filmography

References 

Living people
1989 births
Armenian male ballet dancers
21st-century Armenian actors
Armenian television presenters